Epidexipteryx is a genus of small paravian dinosaurs, known from one fossil specimen in the collection of the Institute of Vertebrate Paleontology and Paleoanthropology in Beijing. Epidexipteryx represents the earliest known example of ornamental feathers in the fossil record.

Discovery

The type specimen is catalog number IVPP V 15471. The specific name, Epidexipteryx hui ("Hu's display feather"), and its Chinese name Hushi Yaolong ("Hu Yaoming's dragon") were coined in memory of paleomammologist Hu Yaoming.

Due to a pre-publication error, a manuscript of the Epidexipteryx hui description first appeared on a preprint Web portal in late September 2008. The paper was officially published in the October 23, 2008 issue of the journal Nature.

Description

E. hui is known from a well-preserved partial skeleton that includes four long feathers on the tail, composed of a central rachis and vanes. However, unlike in modern-style rectrices (tail feathers), the vanes were not branched into individual filaments but made up of a single ribbon-like sheet. Epidexipteryx also preserved a covering of simpler body feathers, composed of parallel barbs as in more primitive feathered dinosaurs. However, the body feathers of Epidexipteryx are unique in that some appear to arise from a "membranous structure" at the base of each feather. It has been suggested that this may represent a stage in the evolution of the feather.

In all, the skeleton of Epidexipteryx hui measures  in length ( including the incomplete tail feathers), and the authors estimated a weight of 164 grams, smaller than most other basal avialans.

The skull of Epidexipteryx is also unique in a number of features, and bears an overall similarity to the skull of Sapeornis, oviraptorosaurs and, to a lesser extent, therizinosauroids. It had teeth only in the front of the jaws, with unusually long front teeth angled forward, a feature only seen in Masiakasaurus among other theropods. The rest of the skeleton bore an overall similarity to the possibly closely related Scansoriopteryx, including a hip configuration unusual among other dinosaurs: the pubis was shorter than the ischium, and the ischium itself was expanded towards the tip. The tail of Epidexipteryx also bore unusual vertebrae towards the tip which resembled the feather-anchoring pygostyle of modern birds and some oviraptorosaurs.

Classification
The exact phylogenetic position of Epidexipteryx within Paraves is uncertain. The phylogenetic analysis conducted by the authors of its description recovered it as a member of the family Scansoriopterygidae and as a basal member of the clade Avialae; this was confirmed by the subsequent analysis conducted by Hu et al. (2009). A later analysis conducted by Agnolín and Novas (2011) confirmed it to be a scansoriopterygid, but recovered a different phylogenetic position of this family: Scansoriopterygidae was recovered in polytomy with the family Alvarezsauridae and the clade Eumaniraptora (containing the clades Avialae and Deinonychosauria). Turner, Makovicky and Norell (2012) included Epidexipteryx but not Scansoriopteryx/Epidendrosaurus in their primary phylogenetic analysis, as a full-grown specimen is known only of the former taxon; regarding Scansoriopteryx/Epidendrosaurus, the authors were worried that including it in the primary analysis would be problematic, because it is only known from juvenile specimens, which "do not necessarily preserve all the adult morphology needed to accurately place a taxon phylogenetically" (Turner, Makovicky and Norell 2012, p. 89). Epidexipteryx was recovered as basal paravian that didn't belong to Eumaniraptora. The authors did note that its phylogenetic position is unstable; constraining Epidexipteryx hui as a basal avialan required two additional steps compared to the most parsimonious solution, while constraining it as a basal member of Oviraptorosauria required only one additional step.

 
 
A separate exploratory analysis included Scansoriopteryx/Epidendrosaurus, which was recovered as a basal member of Avialae; the authors noted that it did not clade with Epidexipteryx, which stayed outside Eumaniraptora. Constraining the monophyly of Scansoriopterygidae required four additional steps and moved Epidexipteryx into Avialae. A monophyletic Scansoriopterygidae was recovered by Godefroit et al. (2013); the authors found scansoriopterygids to be basalmost members of Paraves and the sister group to the clade containing Avialae and Deinonychosauria. Agnolín and Novas (2013) recovered monophyletic Scansoriopterygidae as well, but found them to be non-paravian maniraptorans and the sister group to Oviraptorosauria.

An abbreviated version of Zhang et al.'''s 2008 cladogram is presented below.

PaleobiologyEpidexipteryx appears to have lacked remiges (wing feathers), though based on the related Yi, it may have possessed some sort of membrane wing to allow gliding.Cau, A (2012), Il ritorno del paraviano pterosauro-mimo?, Theropoda, July 2012

PaleoenvironmentEpidexipteryx is known from the Middle Jurassic or Upper Jurassic age Daohugou Beds of Inner Mongolia, China (about 160 or 154 mya).

References

External links
New feathered dinosaur discovered, BBC News''

Prehistoric paravians
Jurassic dinosaurs of Asia
Fossil taxa described in 2008
Feathered dinosaurs